Eugene Donald Bookhammer (June 14, 1918 – February 23, 2013) was an American politician who served as the 18th Lieutenant Governor of Delaware, as a Republican, from 1969 to 1977. He served under Governors Russell W. Peterson and Sherman W. Tribbitt. Before his election as lieutenant governor, he had served in the Delaware State Senate since 1962.

Born in Lewes, Delaware, Bookhammer graduated from Lewes High School and served in the U.S. Army during World War II, receiving the Purple Heart and the Bronze Star. He was in the lumber mill business. With author Richard Carter, in 2009 he wrote his biography, Gene Bookhammer and His World. He died at his home in Lewes in February 2013 at the age of 94.

References

External links
 Delaware's Lieutenant Governors

1918 births
2013 deaths
People from Lewes, Delaware
Businesspeople from Delaware
Writers from Delaware
Republican Party Delaware state senators
Lieutenant Governors of Delaware
Military personnel from Delaware
20th-century American businesspeople
United States Army personnel of World War II